The 12th IBF World Championships, also known as the World Badminton Championships, were held in the Palacio de Deportes de San Pablo, Seville, Spain, between 3 June and 10 June 2001. Following the results of the men's singles.

Seeds

Main stage

Section 1

Section 2

Section 3

Section 4

Final stage

External links 
 Results

2001 IBF World Championships